The 2016–17 Spartak Moscow season was the 25th successive season that the club played in the Russian Premier League, the highest tier of association football in Russia.

Key events 
The pre-season friendlies were against NK Rudar Velenje, Istra 1961, FK Sarajevo, BSC Young Boys, and VfB Stuttgart. On 13 June former Juventus and Squadra Azzurra coach Massimo Carrera joined the club in an assistant manager role.

Manager Dmitri Alenichev resigned from his position after the Spartak's elimination from the UEFA Europa league third qualifying round by AEK Larnaka. Carrera was appointed caretaker manager. Coaches Egor Titov and Oleg Samatov also left the club. After a reported breaking down of the club's negotiations with Kurban Berdyev, on 17 August Massimo Carrera was promoted to a full managerial position after signing a two-year contract.

Squad

Out on loan

Left club during season

Transfers

In

Loans in

Out

Loans out

Released

Competitions

Russian Premier League

League table

Results by round

Results

Russian Cup

UEFA Europa League

Having finished 5th in Russian Premier League in the previous season, the club qualified for UEFA Europe League 3rd qualifying stage.

Qualifying rounds

Squad statistics

Appearances and goals

|-
|colspan="14"|Players away from the club on loan:

|-
|colspan="14"|Players who left Spartak Moscow during the season:

|}

Goal scorers

Clean sheets

Disciplinary record

References 

FC Spartak Moscow seasons
Spartak Moscow
Spartak Moscow
Russian football championship-winning seasons